is a freelance Japanese voice actress from Chiba Prefecture. She was formerly affiliated with Arts Vision until August 2007. She made her voice acting debut as Mita in Kirara while still in college in 1998, and her first lead role was as Kento Yūki in Dennō Bōkenki Webdiver in 2001. She is still good friends with Natsuko Kuwatani, Hisayo Mochizuki, and Nana Mizuki, members of the former voice acting unit Prits; all four voiced characters in Sister Princess.

In an interview in 2019, Kobayashi said that shortly after her debut, while researching how to play a boy who can be dubbed, she came to believe that there was no better way to act than as a child actor, but she was struck by Akiko Yajima's performance as Kevin, the main character in Home Alone, and has since made it her goal. Beginning with the July 6, 2018 episode, she took over the role of Shinnosuke Nohara in Crayon Shin-chan from Yajima, who had played the role since the show began airing on April 13, 1992.

Filmography

Television animation
1999–2002
Beast Wars II: Super Life-Form Transformers (1998), Lio Junior
Excel Saga (1999), Excel Kobayashi
éX-Driver (2000), Sōichi Sugano
Gate Keepers (2000), Hideki
Love Hina (2000), Sarah McDougal
A Little Snow Fairy Sugar (2001), Basil
Magical Play (2001), Zucchini
Sister Princess (2001), Mamoru
Duel Masters (2002), Shobu Kirifuda, Katta Kirifuda
Mirmo! (2002), Beruru
2003–2006
Bomberman Jetters (2003), Kobon
D.N.Angel (2003), young Takeshi Saehara
Ikki Tousen (2003), Ukitsu
Peacemaker Kurogane (2003), Ichimura Tetsunosuke
Sonic X (2003), Bokkun
The Prince of Tennis (2003), Taichi Dan
Tottoko Hamutarō (2003), Solara
Naruto (2004), Nawaki
Superior Defender Gundam Force (2004), Genkimaru
Yakitate!! Japan (2004), Kazuma Azuma
My-Otome (2005), Mahya Blythe
Tsubasa Chronicle (2005), young Kurogane
2007–2010
Les Misérables: Shōjo Cosette (2007), Gavroche
Shakugan no Shana (2007), Matake Ogata
Shakugan no Shana Second (2007), Matake Ogata
Katekyo Hitman Reborn! (2008), Ginger Bread
Soul Eater (2008), Black Star
Slayers Revolution (2008), Pocota
Tales of the Abyss TV series (2008), Ion, SyncThe Tower of Druaga: the Aegis of Uruk (2008), YuryInazuma Eleven (2009), Saiji KirigakureGokyoudai Monogatari (2009), Junichirō JinushiTokyo Magnitude 8.0 (2009), YuukiAngel Beats! (2010), OyamaStitch! ~ Best Friends Forever ~ (2010), ToyodaPocket Monsters: Best Wishes! (2010), Elesa
2011–2014Blue Exorcist (2011), YoheiKamisama Dolls (2011), Kirio HyūgaShakugan no Shana III Final (2011), Matake OgataSuite Precure (2011), Souta MinaminoHumanity Has Declined (2012), FairyJoJo's Bizarre Adventure (2012), PocoOzuma (2012), YamuMysterious Joker (2014), HachiThe Seven Deadly Sins (2014), MeadHozuki's Coolheadedness (2014), Shiro
2015–CurrentGunslinger Stratos (2015), Jonathan SizemoreSeraph of the End (2015), Lest KarrThe Disastrous Life of Saiki K. (2016), Yūta IridatsuRe:Zero − Starting Life in Another World (2016), MildDuel Masters (2017), Joe KirifudaCrayon Shin-chan (2018), Shinnosuke NoharaDigimon Adventure (2020), Koshiro IzumiNinjala (2022), VanTōsōchū: The Great Mission (2023), Haru Tomura

OVAPuni Puni Poemy (2001), Poemy "Kobayashi" WatanabeHori-san to Miyamura-kun (2012), Souta Hori

ONAThe Heike Story (2021)

Theatrical animationDoraemon: Nobita and the New Steel Troops—Winged Angels (2011), PippoSmile PreCure! The Movie: Big Mismatch in a Picture Book! (2012), Sun WukongAura: Koga Maryuin's Last War (2013), ItōCrayon Shin-chan: Honeymoon Hurricane ~The Lost Hiroshi~ (2019), Shinnosuke NoharaCrayon Shin-chan: Crash! Graffiti Kingdom and Almost Four Heroes (2020), Shinnosuke NoharaCrayon Shin-chan: Shrouded in Mystery! The Flowers of Tenkazu Academy (2021), Shinnosuke NoharaThe Orbital Children (2022), Hiroshi TanegashimaCrayon Shin-chan: Mononoke Ninja Chinpūden (2022), Shinnosuke NoharaDrifting Home (2022), Taishi Koiwai

Video gamesEternal Sonata, BeatMega Man Powered Up, Mega ManPrincess Maker 4, LeeProfessor Layton and the Last Specter, Toni BardeRomancing SaGa, AishaSuper Robot Wars series, Ryoto HikawaStar Ocean: Second Evolution, Leon D.S. GeesteTokimeki Memorial Girl's Side: 2nd Kiss, Yuu OtonariGod of War, AtreusGranblue Fantasy, Mimlemel
 Sdorica Sunset, Lio, ElioNinjala, Van

Drama CDsAmai Kuchizuke (2012), Young Yuu Takamura

Dubbing
Live-actionBoyhood, Mason Evans Jr. (Younger) (Ellar Coltrane)December Boys, Misty (Lee Cormie)Dolphin Tale, Sawyer Nelson (Nathan Gamble)Dragon Blade, Publius (Jozef Waite)Earth to Echo, Reginald "Munch" Barrett (Reese Hartwig)Falling Skies (season 1–3), Matt Mason (Maxim Knight)Hannah Montana: The Movie, Lilly Truscott (Emily Osment)Hereafter, Jason and Marcus (Frankie and George McLaren)I Am Legend (2010 TV Asahi edition), Ethan (Charlie Tahan)The Impossible, Lucas Bennett (Tom Holland)It Chapter One, Eddie Kaspbrak (Jack Dylan Grazer)It Chapter Two, Young Eddie Kaspbrak (Jack Dylan Grazer)Jingle All the Way 2, Noel Phillips (Kennedi Clements)Nanny McPhee and the Big Bang, Cyril Gray (Eros Vlahos)Parasite (2021 NTV edition), Park Da-song (Jung Hyeon-jun)Ready Player One, Zhou (Philip Zhao)Rust and Bone, Sam (Armand Verdure)Safe House, Joe Blackwell (Max True)The Spy Next Door, Ian (Will Shadley)Tale of Tales, Imma (Shirley Henderson)Trash, Raphael (Rickson Tevez)

AnimationThe Amazing World of Gumball, Darwin WattersonChuggington'', Wilson

References

External links
  
 
 
 

1979 births
Living people
Arts Vision voice actors
Japanese video game actresses
Japanese voice actresses
Musicians from Chiba Prefecture
Prits members
Voice actresses from Chiba Prefecture
20th-century Japanese actresses
20th-century Japanese women singers
20th-century Japanese singers
21st-century Japanese actresses
21st-century Japanese women singers
21st-century Japanese singers